The king (♔, ♚) is the most important piece in the game of chess. It may move to any adjoining square; it may also perform a move known as castling. If this cannot be done, the king is said to be in checkmate, resulting in a loss for that player. A player cannot make any move that places their own king in check. Despite this, the king can become a strong offensive piece in the endgame or, rarely, the middlegame.

In algebraic notation, the king is abbreviated by the letter K among English speakers. The white king starts the game on e1; the black king starts on e8. Unlike all other pieces, only one king per player can be on the board at any time, and the kings are never removed from the board during the game.

Placement and movement

The white king starts on e1, on the first  to the right of the queen from White's perspective. The black king starts on e8, directly across from the white king. Each king starts on a square opposite its own color.

A king can move one square horizontally, vertically, or diagonally unless the square is already occupied by a friendly piece or the move would place the king in check. If the square is occupied by an undefended enemy piece, the king may capture it, removing it from play. Opposing kings may never occupy adjacent squares (see opposition) to give check, as that would put the moving king in check as well. The king can give discovered check, however, by unblocking a bishop, rook, or queen.

Castling

The king can make a special move, in conjunction with a rook of the same color, called castling. When castling, the king moves two squares horizontally toward one of its rooks, and that rook is placed on the square over which the king crossed.

Castling is permissible under the following conditions:
 Neither the king nor the castling rook have previously moved.
 No squares between the two pieces are occupied.
 The king is not in check.
 None of the squares the king would move across or to are under enemy attack.

Castling with the h-file rook is known as castling kingside or short castling (denoted 0-0 in algebraic notation), while castling with the a-file rook is known as castling queenside or long castling (denoted 0-0-0).

Status in games

Check and checkmate

A king that is under attack is said to be in check, and the player in check must immediately remedy the situation. There are three possible ways to remove the king from check:
The king is moved to an adjacent non-threatened square. A king cannot castle to get out of check. A king can capture an adjacent enemy piece if that piece is not protected by another enemy piece.
A piece is interposed between the king and the attacking piece to break the line of threat (not possible when the attacking piece is a knight or pawn, or when in double check).
The attacking piece is captured (not possible when in double check, unless the king captures).

If none of the three options are available, the player's king has been checkmated, and the player loses the game.

At amateur levels, when placing the opponent's king in check, it is common to announce "check", but this is not required by the rules of chess.

Stalemate

A stalemate occurs when a player, on their turn, has no legal moves, and the player's king is not in check.

If this happens, the king is said to have been stalemated, and the game ends in a draw. A player who has very little or no chance of winning will often, in order to avoid a loss, try to entice the opponent to inadvertently place the player's king in stalemate (see swindle).

History

The king's predecessor is the piece of the same name in shatranj. Like the modern king, it is the most important piece in the game and can move to any neighboring square. However, in shatranj, baring the king is a win unless the opponent can do the same immediately afterward; stalemating the king is a win; and castling does not exist.

Role in gameplay
In the opening and middlegame, the king will rarely play an active role in the development of an offensive or defensive position. Instead, a player will normally try to castle and seek safety on the edge of the board behind friendly pawns. In the endgame, however, the king emerges to play an active role as an offensive piece, and can assist in the promotion of the player's remaining pawns.

It is not meaningful to assign a value to the king relative to the other pieces, as it cannot be captured or exchanged and must be protected at all costs. In this sense, its value could be considered infinite. As an assessment of the king's capability as an offensive piece in the endgame, it is often considered to be slightly stronger than a bishop or knight. Emanuel Lasker gave it the value of a knight plus a pawn (i.e. four points on the scale of chess piece relative value), though some other theorists evaluate it closer to three points. It is better at defending friendly pawns than the knight is, and it is better at attacking enemy pawns than the bishop is.

Unicode

Unicode defines two codepoints for king:

♔ U+2654 White Chess King (HTML &#9812;)

♚ U+265A Black Chess King (HTML &#9818;)

See also

Notes

References

 

FIDE Handbook: Laws of Chess

External links

Fianchetto variation of the King’s Indian Defence 
Piececlopedia: King by Fergus Duniho and Hans Bodlaender, The Chess Variant Pages

Chess pieces